Jan-Olov Liljenzin (1936-2019) was a Swedish chemist and professor in nuclear chemistry.

Liljenzin was professor at University of Oslo, Nuclear Chemistry, Norway 1986-1989, and at Chalmers University of Technology, Nuclear Chemistry, Gothenburg, Sweden, between 1989 and 2001.

Liljenzin made early contributions to the understanding of the influence of chemistry on core melt accidents and participated in international research about iodine chemistry and how to mitigate radioactive releases from nuclear accidents. He also investigated various methods of treatment and separation of spent radioactive fuel as well as chemical aspects of final repository for radioactive waste.

Liljenzin was a co-author to Radiochemistry and nuclear chemistry which 2013 was issued in its 4:th edition. He was a co-author to a number of scientific papers about nuclear chemistry with applications to separation of nuclear waste and chemical processes during severe nuclear accidents. His publications has an h-index impact of 20.

Notes 

Swedish chemists
1936 births
Swedish expatriates in Norway
Academic staff of the University of Oslo
Academic staff of the Chalmers University of Technology
2019 deaths